Karen Forkel (born 24 September 1970 in Wolfen) is a German track and field athlete and an Olympic medal winner. In the 1990s she was among the world's best javelin throwers.  Her biggest success came in the 1992 Summer Olympics when she took the bronze medal with a throw of 66.86 meters.

Her personal best throw with the new-type-javelin was 65.17 metres, achieved in July 1999 in Erfurt. This ranks her fifth among German javelin throwers, behind Christina Obergföll, Steffi Nerius, Tanja Damaske and Linda Stahl. With the old javelin type she threw 70.20 metres in May 1991 in Halle. This ranks her fifth among German old-type-javelin throwers, behind Petra Felke (who held the world record), Antje Kempe, Silke Renk and Beate Koch.

Forkel represented SC Chemie Halle, which after the German reunification was renamed SV Halle. During her career she was 1.72 meters tall and weighed 63 kilograms.

International competitions

 1993 European Cup (athletics) final: 2nd place (61.92)
 1994 IAAF World Cup final: 3rd place (61.26); 1994 European cup final: 2nd place (65.58)
 2000 European Cup (athletics) Final: 6th place (52.89)

References

External links
 
 
 

1970 births
Living people
People from Bitterfeld-Wolfen
German female javelin throwers
East German female javelin throwers
Olympic athletes of Germany
Olympic bronze medalists for Germany
Olympic bronze medalists in athletics (track and field)
Athletes (track and field) at the 1992 Summer Olympics
Athletes (track and field) at the 1996 Summer Olympics
Medalists at the 1992 Summer Olympics
World Athletics Championships athletes for Germany
World Athletics Championships medalists
European Athletics Championships medalists
Universiade medalists in athletics (track and field)
Universiade bronze medalists for Germany
Medalists at the 1997 Summer Universiade
Sportspeople from Saxony-Anhalt